Ulrich Klaes (born 1 February 1946 in Essen) is a former field hockey player from Germany, who was a member of the West German squad that won the gold medal at the 1972 Summer Olympics in Munich.

External links
 
Profile at Sports Reference.com

1946 births
Living people
German male field hockey players
Olympic field hockey players of West Germany
Field hockey players at the 1972 Summer Olympics
Olympic medalists in field hockey
Olympic gold medalists for West Germany
Sportspeople from Essen
Medalists at the 1972 Summer Olympics
20th-century German people